The Eastern Grass Court Championships was a combined men's and women's tennis tournament held in the eastern United States from 1927 to 1969.

History
The first edition was held in 1927 at the Westchester Country Club, in Rye, New York. In 1946 the tournament relocated to the Orange Lawn Tennis Club in South Orange, New Jersey. The tournament was played on outdoor grass courts and was usually held in August. In 1970 the tournament was renamed the Marlborough Open which continued until 1983.

Past finals 
Included:

Singles

Men

Women

See also
 South Orange Open

References

External links
 Orange Lawn Tennis Club 1880–1980 part 2
 Orange Lawn Tennis Club 1880–1980 part 3

Grass court tennis tournaments
Recurring sporting events established in 1927
Recurring events disestablished in 1974
Defunct tennis tournaments in the United States
1927 establishments in New York (state)
1989 disestablishments in New Jersey
South Orange Open